Eugene Basic Materials Company is a South Korean chemical manufacturing company specializing in slag and cement.  It is headquartered in Susong-dong, Jongno-gu, Seoul.  It is a member of the Eugene Group of companies, and was established in 1999.

The CEO is Choi Jeong Ho (최정호).

Products
The company is a manufacturer of slag powder, cement and aggregate products.  Its manufacturing facilities are located in Manseok-dong, Dong-gu, Incheon.

Blast Furnace Slag (Ground Granulated, Cement, Low-Heat, Alkali)
Non-Explosive Demolition Agent
ALFA (Artificial Light-weight Fine Aggregate)

See also
Eugene Group
Eugene Concrete
Chaebol
Economy of South Korea
List of South Korean companies

External links
Eugene Basic Materials Company Homepage 

Chemical companies of South Korea
Chemical companies established in 1999
Eugene Group
South Korean companies established in 1999